Paritosh is an Indian first name and may be:
 Paritosh Pandya, Indian computer scientist
 Paritosh Sen, Indian artist
Paritosh Shukla, Practising Advocate, ll.b. gold medalist 
Paritosh Singh, Bachelors in Technology
Meaning 
One who is fully satisfied, desire nothing and happy in all circumstances 
 This name has several mentioning in TULSIDAS written RAMCHARIT MANAS.